La Barredora ("The Sweeper Truck") is a criminal gang based in the Mexican resort city of Acapulco, Guerrero and its surrounding territories. The criminal group came into existence during the rapid decentralization of Mexico's drug trafficking organizations and as a split-off group of the Beltrán-Leyva Cartel. Originally, the Beltrán Leyva cartel operated in the city, but the group no longer has presence in Acapulco. After the Mexican military gunned down the top boss of the cartel – Arturo Beltrán Leyva – in December 2009, his brother Héctor Beltrán Leyva took control of one of the factions of the cartel and declared war on Edgar Valdez Villarreal, who had long been the right hand of Arturo. Amidst the violence, Valdez Villarreal tried to appoint a successor, but those in Acapulco broke off and formed their own criminal gang: the Independent Cartel of Acapulco. Within weeks, however, the group had splintered too, forming a new and rival group known as La Barredora. Villarreal Valdez was then captured by the Mexican Federal Police in August 2010, but the violence between the groups for the control of Acapulco continued.

The group's leader, Eder Jair Sosa Carvajal, nicknamed "El Cremas", founded the organization along with Christian Hernández Tarín, AKA "El Chris" (arrested on October 18, 2011) and Víctor Manuel Rivera Galeana, AKA "El Gordo"  (on November 4, 2011).

The cartel's area of operations have centered on the resort area and port city of Acapulco. The cartel is known to battle its rival, the Independent Cartel of Acapulco (also an offshoot of the Beltrán Leyva Cartel) and to have links with the Sinaloa Cartel.

References

Organizations established in 2010
2010 establishments in Mexico
Drug cartels in Mexico
Mexican drug war
Acapulco